Socialdemocrats for Faith and Solidarity, formerly the Swedish Association of Christian Social Democrats (commonly known as Broderskapsrörelsen, "the Brotherhood Movement") organizes religious members of the Swedish Social Democratic Party. The organization was founded in 1929 as an organization for Christian socialdemocrats. Since 2011, it has been open for members of all religions. It is an associate member of the International League of Religious Socialists.

The former Prime Minister of Sweden Göran Persson is a member of the organization.

List of chairpersons 
 Bertil Mogård, 1929–1954
 Åke Zetterberg, 1954–1968
 Evert Svensson, 1968–1986
 Georg Andersson, 1986–1990
 Torgny Larsson, 1990–1992
 Berndt Ekholm, 1992–1999
 Anna Berger Kettner, 1999–2005
 Peter Weiderud, 2005–2015
 Ulf Bjereld 2015–

Controversy
The Swedish Association of Christian Social Democrats has received criticism for its cooperation with various alleged Islamist and anti-Zionist groups and people. In November 2005 the organization together with the Social Democratic Students of Sweden and the Muslim Council of Sweden invited the Palestinian-British academic Azzam Tamimi to hold a speech at a seminar at the Stockholm Mosque entitled Islam and Democratic Development. Tamimi has referred to Israel as a "cancer" and expressed support for the violent struggle of Hamas and Hezbollah against Israel.

In March 2007, the Swedish Association of Christian Socialdemocrats together with the workers' educational association ABF and the journal Folket i Bild/Kulturfront invited the Israeli-born activist and musician Gilad Atzmon to hold a speech at a seminar in Stockholm entitled Iraq, Palestine and Afghanistan: same occupation?. The invitation led to strong criticism from the chairman of the Swedish Committee Against Antisemitism (SKMA), who called Atzmon a "notorious anti-Semite". In a reply, Ulf Carmesund of the Swedish Association of Christian Social Democrats countered that SKMA is on a dangerous path, devaluing the whole concept of antisemitism, when they attempt to apply the term to antizionism. Atzom is critical of Israels policies and of organizations that spuriously support Israel in the name of all Jews. Scholars at Lund University Sameh Egyptson criticize "the Brotherhood Movement" for its cooperation with The Muslim Council of Sweden, SMR over which the Muslim Brotherhood has an influence. In this collaboration, it had been agreed that activists in SMR should be included in social democratic electoral lists for the Swedish parliament, the county council and municipalastes.

In the summer of 2006, the priest Tommy Sandberg decided to leave the organization. According to the newspaper Dagen, one of the main reasons was that the organization "turns a blind eye to antisemitic occurrences".

See also
Christian socialism
Christian left

References

External links
Religious Social Democrats of Sweden, official website

Political organizations based in Sweden
Religious organizations based in Sweden
Swedish Social Democratic Party
1929 establishments in Sweden
Christian organizations established in 1929